Divine Love Conquering Earthly Love is an oil on canvas painting dating to 1602–1603, now held in the collection of the Galleria Nazionale d'Arte Antica in Palazzo Barberini, Rome. It was painted by Italian painter Giovanni Baglione. It is the second version that Baglione painted of this subject; the first version is now in the Gemäldegalerie, Staatliche Museen in Berlin. Both of these versions were painted for Cardinal Benedetto Giustiniani, and played into the rivalry between Baglione and his contemporary, Caravaggio. Baglione accused Caravaggio of circulating poems disparaging the painting, which resulted in a 1603 libel lawsuit.

Citations 

1602 paintings
1603 paintings
Paintings by Giovanni Baglione